Catedral Basílica Inmaculada Concepción del Buen Viaje is located in Morón, Buenos Aires Province, Argentina. It is the seat of the Diocese of Morón and is dedicated to the Virgin of the Immaculate Conception of Good Voyage. It was completed in 1885.

External links

 Official website of the parish 

Roman Catholic churches completed in 1885
Roman Catholic cathedrals in Buenos Aires Province
Morón Partido
19th-century Roman Catholic church buildings in Argentina